Separate Lies is a 2005 British drama film directed by Julian Fellowes, who also wrote the screenplay, updating the 1951 novel A Way Through the Wood by Nigel Balchin, which had already been turned into a stage play under the title Waiting for Gillian in 1954. The film stars Tom Wilkinson, Emily Watson and Rupert Everett. Separate Lies marked the directorial debut of Julian Fellowes, who had worked mostly as an actor and won an Academy Award with his screenplay for Robert Altman's  Gosford Park.

Plot 
"No life is perfect – even if it seems to be," says James Manning, a wealthy London solicitor. When it comes to matters of right and wrong, he likes to think of himself as inflexible. Anne, his much younger wife, is accommodating and dutiful and likes the life they lead, the house in London, the Buckinghamshire hideaway. The couple seems to have it all, yet events soon will prove them wrong.

In the village, a neighbour has reappeared: William Bule, son of a leading local family. He has recently returned from America, a bad marriage and two children, whose ages he cannot bother to remember. Bill is indolent and insinuating and at the village cricket match he catches Anne's eye. Because of him, she suggests to her reluctant husband that they should have neighbours over for drinks. However, that evening, James has to work late in the city. Before the party is set to begin, a speeding car sideswipes a man bicycling along a village lane. The man is hurled to the ground and dies a few days later. He was the husband of Maggie, the Mannings’ housekeeper.

Anne takes a special interest in Maggie's well-being, but James can't understand her sudden teary investment in their housekeeper’s personal life. James, whose priorities have become skewed toward work rather than toward his wife, soon becomes suspicious that Bill may be involved in that fatal hit-and-run. When confronted, Bill initially denies the allegation, but soon tells James that the next day he will go to the police and confess, if that is what he wants, although he sees no benefit from his confessions. Back home, when James tells Anne about his conversation with Bill, she has also some striking confessions to make. Anne reveals one hurtful secret while making a salad: she was actually driving Bill’s car when drunk and accidentally hit the cyclist.  While artfully arranging ingredients on a platter, she informs her already distraught husband that she has also been having an affair with Bill. Telling her story, she asserts that Bill doesn't really mean anything to her, because he doesn't make demands or judge her, as James does in little, incessant ways. Precisely because he's a lout, Bill makes her feel oddly liberated, if not loved.

As a Buckinghamshire police inspector questions the Mannings and Bill about the accident, James is torn between doing the right thing and maintaining appearances at all costs. James really loves Anne, and the couple takes a trip to Wales in an effort to leave the accident, their guilt, and their marital troubles behind. However, Maggie, whose husband was killed, witnessed the accident. She saw the car and identifies it as belonging to Bill Bule. Yet her testimony may be biased, since Maggie knows William Bule well, having worked for his family until she was accused of stealing and dismissed. It was Anne who gave her a new start in the village.

Bule calls for a meeting  with James and Anne. There he says the inspector will come to question them later and that Maggie has identified the car. He requests James to provide an alibi for him to which James agrees. Next day the inspector meets James at his office to confirm the alibi claimed by Bule. Later a mechanic calls Bule to tell about the questioning from police about respraying the car. This makes Anne nervous and she runs to Maggie to tell her the truth and that she is responsible for her husband's death. Maggie being indebted to Anne for giving her the job after eight years takes back her statement about Bule driving the car when confronted by police. Anne goes back to stay with James until one day he's informed by a cousin of Bule that he is dying of cancer. Learning this from James, Anne rushes back to the dying Bule whose father comes to James to express his gratitude for this. Following this James meets Anne near Bule's home and expresses his undiminished love for her. Upon the demise of Bule, Anne is reunited with James.

Cast
 Tom Wilkinson as James Manning  
 Emily Watson as Anne Manning 
 Rupert Everett as William "Bill" Bule 
 Richenda Carey as Sarah Tufnell
 David Harewood as Inspector Marshall  
 Linda Bassett as Maggie
 Hermione Norris as Priscilla
 John Warnaby as Simon     
 John Neville as Lord Rawston
 Philip Rham as French Lawyer
 Unknown as Joe

External links 
 
 
 

2005 films
2005 romantic drama films
2000s English-language films
British romantic drama films
Films about adultery in the United Kingdom
Films about road accidents and incidents
Films based on British novels
Films directed by Julian Fellowes
Films set in London
Films with screenplays by Julian Fellowes
Fox Searchlight Pictures films
2000s British films